The Naya Kadan is a political party in Suriname.

Political parties in Suriname